Magers is a surname. Notable people with the surname include:

Paul Magers, American television news anchor
Philomene Magers, German art dealer
Ron Magers (born 1944), American television journalist and news anchor
Rose Magers (born 1960), American volleyball player
Sergejs Maģers (1912–1989), Latvian footballer